Age of Steam or Steam Age may refer to:
A period of industrialization in parts of Europe between roughly 1770 and 1914
Steam power during the Industrial Revolution
Steam-powered vessels
History of the steam engine

As a proper name
Age of Steam, 1972 album by Gerry Mulligan
Age of Steam (game), a strategy board game of 2002

See also
Naval tactics in the Age of Steam
Steampunk